The Bishop of Newcastle is the ordinary of the Church of England's Diocese of Newcastle in the Province of York.

The diocese presently covers the County of Northumberland and the Alston Moor area of Cumbria. The see is in the city of Newcastle upon Tyne where the seat is located at the Cathedral Church of Saint Nicholas, a parish church elevated to cathedral status in 1882. The bishop's residence is Bishop's House, Gosforth — not far north of Newcastle city centre.

The office has existed since the founding of the diocese in 1882 under Queen Victoria by division of the diocese of Durham. Helen-Ann Hartley became diocesan Bishop of Newcastle on 3 February 2023, the confirmation of her election.

List of bishops

Assistant bishops

Among those others who have served the diocese as assistant bishops have been:
19241933 (res.): Cecil Wood, Vicar of Jesmond and former Bishop of Melanesia
Anthony Hunter resigned as assistant bishop effective 1 September 1980.

References

Newcastle
 
Bishops of Newcastle